Vicente Guida Berlanga Henriques (born September 5, 1978 in São Paulo) is a water polo player from Brazil. He competed in three consecutive Pan American Games for his native country, starting in 1999. Henriques won two silver medals at this event with the Brazil men's national water polo team.

References
 Profile

1978 births
Living people
Brazilian male water polo players
Water polo players from São Paulo
Pan American Games silver medalists for Brazil
Pan American Games medalists in water polo
Water polo players at the 2003 Pan American Games
Water polo players at the 2007 Pan American Games
Medalists at the 2003 Pan American Games
Medalists at the 2007 Pan American Games
21st-century Brazilian people